RMC Group plc (formerly "Ready Mixed Concrete Limited") was a ready mixed concrete, quarrying and concrete products company headquartered in Egham, United Kingdom. It was listed on the London Stock Exchange and was once a constituent of the FTSE 100 Index, but was acquired by Cemex of Mexico in 2005.

History
The Company was founded by Kjeld Ammentorp in 1930 in Bedfont as Ready Mixed Concrete Limited. In 1952, Ready Mixed Concrete of Australia reversed into its UK rival and began to expand. The company was first listed on the London Stock Exchange in 1962. In 1979, the company created Thorpe Park in Staines, Surrey by redeveloping one of its disused quarries as a leisure park when quarrying was complete. The company operated Thorpe Park until 1998, when they sold the park to The Tussauds Group, owner of Alton Towers and nearby Chessington World of Adventures. The company acquired Rugby Group, a leading British cement business, in 2000. In 2005, the company was acquired by Cemex of Mexico.

Operations
RMC was a leading international producer and supplier of materials, products and services used primarily in the construction industry.

See also
Aggregate Industries - UK Quarry company
Blue Circle Industries - Cement
Redland plc - Quarries and Ready-mix supplier
Tarmac plc - Quarries and Ready-mix supplier
Construction industry of the United Kingdom

References

External links
Cemex Official site

2005 mergers and acquisitions
Manufacturing companies established in 1930
Companies formerly listed on the London Stock Exchange
Companies based in Surrey
Cement companies of the United Kingdom
1930 establishments in England
Manufacturing companies disestablished in 2005
2005 disestablishments in England